Hamidi Kashmiri was an Indian poet in Urdu and a former Vice Chancellor of the University of Kashmir. Hamidi Kashmiri is credited with 50 books, Iqtishafi Tanqeed Ki Sheryat, Ainame Ibraaq, Mahasir Tanqeed, Riyasati Jammu Aur Kashmir Urdu Adab, Jadeed Kashir Shayeri and Shiekh–ul-Aalam Aur Shayeri being some of the notable ones.

Kashmiri is a recipient of the Ghalib Award and Sahitya Akademi Award (2005). The Government of India honored him in 2010, with the fourth highest civilian award of Padma Shri.

References

External links

 
 

Recipients of the Padma Shri in literature & education
People from Jammu and Kashmir
Recipients of the Sahitya Akademi Award in Urdu
Urdu-language writers from India
1932 births
2018 deaths